The I Love the 90s: The Party Continues Tour is the second edition in a concert series created by the Universal Attractions Agency. The tour is a celebration of prominent acts from the 1990s. American vocal group TLC headlined the 2017 edition. Each show featured six to eight acts performing in arenas and amphitheaters in North America.

Lineup
Headliner
TLC

Featured acts
Naughty By Nature
Mark McGrath
All-4-One
Montell Jordan
Biz Markie 
Snap! 
Blackstreet
C+C Music Factory with Freedom Williams

Special guests
Kid 'n Play 
Rob Base 
Coolio 
Color Me Badd 
Tone Loc 
Young MC 
O-Town

Tour dates

Festivals and other miscellaneous performances
Champlain Valley Fair
Ravinia Festival

Cancellations and rescheduled shows

References

2017 concert tours
Co-headlining concert tours
TLC (group) concert tours